The Gate of Correct Conduct (Manchu:  tob dasan-i duka), or the Gate of Moral Standards, Zhendumen, is a gate on the west side of the Gate of Supreme Harmony. It was first built together with the Gate of Supreme Harmony and named West Corner Gate, and was later renamed the Gate of Proclaiming Governance by Jiajing Emperor in 1526. The fire destroyed the gate in the 14th year of Guangxu and was rebuilt the consecutive year. Its today's name was given by the Qing Emperors.

References

External links

 

Buildings and structures in Beijing
Forbidden City